Chloé Wang (born April 18, 1992), known professionally as Chloe Bennet, is an American actress and singer. She starred as Daisy Johnson/Quake in the ABC superhero drama series Marvel's Agents of S.H.I.E.L.D. (2013–2020).

Early life 
Chloe Bennet was born Chloé Wang on April 18, 1992, in Chicago, Illinois. She is the daughter of Bennet Wang, an investment banker and Stephanie Crane, an internist.

Bennet's mother is Anglo-American and her father is Chinese. She has seven brothers: four biological, two foster and one adopted; two are of African American ancestry and one is of Mexican and Filipino descent. She attended St. Ignatius College Prep.

Career

2007–2011: Music debut and acting beginnings 
In 2007, at age 15, Bennet moved to China to pursue a singing career, under her birth name, Chloé Wang. While in China, Bennet lived with her paternal grandmother and studied Mandarin. Back in the US, she released two singles, both in 2011: "Uh Oh" and "Every Day in Between".
In 2010 she moved to Los Angeles, California. Her first on-screen appearance was as a host for the short-lived TeenNick summer dance series The Nightlife. She appeared in the 2011 music video for South Korean band BIGBANG's "Tonight". While pursuing an acting career in Hollywood, she changed her name to "Chloe Bennet," after having trouble booking gigs with her last name. According to Bennet, using her father's first name, rather than his last name avoids difficulties being cast as an ethnic Asian American while respecting her father.

2012–present: Breakthrough 
From 2012 to 2013, she had a recurring supporting role in the ABC drama series Nashville as Hailey. In December 2012, she was cast as a series regular on the ABC series Agents of S.H.I.E.L.D., which premiered on September 24, 2013. Bennet portrayed a hacker known as Skye, who was revealed to be Daisy Johnson / Quake in the second season. Bennet was awarded the "Visionary Award" by East West Players, the longest-running professional theater of color in the United States, on April 21, 2017, at their annual gala. She dedicated her award "to all the little girls who want to be a superhero; I'm just a half Chinese girl from the southside of Chicago."

In 2019, Bennet was cast in the lead role as Yi in the animated film Abominable. She appeared in the 2020 film Valley Girl, a jukebox musical remake of the 1983 film of the same name, as Karen, the "Queen Bee". The film was originally scheduled for release in June 2018, but was postponed due to controversy around one of its cast members, Logan Paul. 

In March 2021, she was cast as Blossom Utonium in the upcoming CW live-action pilot Powerpuff, alongside Dove Cameron as Bubbles and Yana Perrault as Buttercup. However, after a decision to reshoot the pilot episode and subsequent scheduling conflicts, Bennet left the project in August 2021.

Personal life 

In 2018, she revealed that she has had anxiety and ADHD since childhood.

Bennet has described the American film and television industry as racist against Asian Americans and other people of Asian descent. In a 2016 interview, she noted, "Oh, the first audition I went on after I changed my name [from Wang to Bennet], I got booked. So that's a pretty clear little snippet of how Hollywood works." In September 2017, after actor Ed Skrein stepped down from his role as Major Ben Daimio in the then-in production film Hellboy following backlash over the fact that Skrein, a white actor, was playing Daimio, a character who is Japanese-American in the Hellboy comics, Bennet wrote a since-deleted post on Instagram in which she applauded Skrein's decision, and addressed her own experiences as an actress of Asian descent in Hollywood, saying, "Changing my last name doesn't change the fact that my BLOOD is half Chinese, that I lived in China, speak Mandarin or that I was culturally raised both American and Chinese. It means I had to pay my rent, and Hollywood is racist and wouldn't cast me with a last name that made them uncomfortable."

Filmography

Film

Television

Music videos

Discography

Singles

See also 
 History of the Chinese Americans in Chicago

References

External links 

 
 

1992 births
21st-century American actresses
21st-century American singers
Actresses from Chicago
Models from Chicago
American actresses of Chinese descent
American film actresses
American soap opera actresses
American television actresses
American voice actresses
American musicians of Chinese descent
Living people
St. Ignatius College Prep alumni